Santa Rosa Airport  is a public use airport serving the town of Santa Rosa in the Beni Department of Bolivia. The runway is adjacent to the east side of the town.

See also

Transport in Bolivia
List of airports in Bolivia

References

External links 
OpenStreetMap - Santa Rosa
OurAirports - Santa Rosa
SkyVector - Santa Rosa

Airports in Beni Department